Melchior de Escuda Aybar (1631 – 26 March 1679) was a Roman Catholic prelate who served as Auxiliary Bishop of Seville (1671–1679).

Biography
Melchior de Escuda Aybar was born in Seville, Spain. On 24 August 1671, he was appointed during the papacy of Pope Clement X as Auxiliary Bishop of Seville and Titular Bishop of Utica. In 1671, he was consecrated bishop by Ambrosio Ignacio Spínola y Guzmán, Archbishop of Seville, with Alfonso Vázquez de Toledo, Bishop of Cádiz, and James Lynch, Archbishop of Tuam, serving as co-consecrators. He served as Auxiliary Bishop of Seville until his death on 26 March 1679.

While bishop, he was the principal co-consecrator of Alonso Antonio de San Martín, Bishop of Oviedo (1676).

References

External links and additional sources
 (for Chronology of Bishops) 
 (for Chronology of Bishops) 

1631 births
1679 deaths
17th-century Roman Catholic bishops in Spain
Bishops appointed by Pope Clement X